Aimé Boji Sangara Bamanyirue is a Congolese politician who has been Minister of Budget in the Cabinet of the Democratic Republic of the Congo since April 2021. He was formerly Minister of Foreign Trade. He was a Union for the Congolese Nation Member of the National Assembly from 2006 to 2019.

He was educated at Collège Alfajiri in Bukavu, Oxford Brookes University (BSc Economics, Business Administration and Management, 1994), the Refugee Studies Centre, and the University of East Anglia (MA Development Economics, 1997). He has been Permanent Secretary of the UNC's National Policy Directorate since 2011. He was previously aligned to the People's Party for Reconstruction and Democracy. He is the brother-in-law of Vital Kamerhe.

References

Year of birth missing (living people)
Living people
Alumni of Oxford Brookes University
Alumni of the University of East Anglia
Members of the National Assembly (Democratic Republic of the Congo)
Government ministers of the Democratic Republic of the Congo
People's Party for Reconstruction and Democracy politicians
Union for the Congolese Nation politicians
Place of birth missing (living people)
21st-century Democratic Republic of the Congo people